Stephen Mathias Mesner (January 13, 1918 – April 6, 1981) was a professional baseball player who was a third baseman in the Major Leagues at various times between 1938 and 1945.  He played for the Chicago Cubs, St. Louis Cardinals, and Cincinnati Reds. He was also a long-time player in the minor leagues, cracking the lineup of the Los Angeles Angels of the Pacific Coast League at age 16 in 1934, and attaining starting status the following year. Mesner amassed 2,965 base hits in 21 seasons between the majors and minors.

External links

1918 births
1981 deaths
Major League Baseball third basemen
Chicago Cubs players
St. Louis Cardinals players
Cincinnati Reds players
Ogden Reds players
Baseball players from Los Angeles